Pyotr Kuzmich Krenitsyn (1728 – July 4, 1770), spelt "Krenitzin" in the United States,  was a Russian explorer and Captain/Lieutenant of the Imperial Russian Navy. Following Vitus Bering's 1741 tragic venture he was the first to conduct an expedition to Alaska and the Aleutians. Krenitsyn was sent, together with Mikhail Levashev, by Russian Empress Catherine II to explore the northern parts of the Pacific Ocean and particularly the area around the Bering strait in four ships. Krenitsyn was the commander of the ship St. Catherine and Levashev commanded the ship St. Paul.

Life 
Krenitsyn and Levashev surveyed the eastern part of the Aleutian island chain until the cold weather set in. Krenitsyn wintered in the strait between Unimak and the Alaska Peninsula. The following year, after resuming their surveys, both ships wintered in Kamchatka.

Certain geographic features of the Alaskan coast, like Avatanak, Akutan and Tigalda Island were named by Krenitsyn in the maps that were subsequently published.

On July 4, 1770, Krenitsyn drowned in the Kamchatka River and Levashev assumed command of the Russian expeditionary fleet. The Krenitzin Islands and the highest volcano on Onekotan Island were named by IRN Captain Mikhail Tebenkov after this early Russian explorer.

References

External links 
The Naming of Alaska
Old map of Alaska showing Krenitzin and Levashev"s route
Cartographic Sources For The History Of Russian Geographical Discoveries In The Pacific Ocean

1728 births
1770 deaths
Bering Sea
Russian explorers of North America
Explorers of Alaska
Explorers of Asia
Explorers from the Russian Empire
Imperial Russian Navy personnel
Deaths by drowning
Accidental deaths in Russia